The AAG was a four-cylinder, four-speed, shaft-driven car designed by an engineer named Burchardt. It was manufactured in Germany in 1906 and 1907.

Defunct motor vehicle manufacturers of Germany
Vintage vehicles
Cars introduced in 1906